The Walkers were a popular Dutch band of the 1970s, based in Maastricht. The group began as a skiffle group in 1963 and continued in mainstream pop music till 1989.

References

Dutch musical groups
Musicians from Maastricht